Protea witzenbergiana, or Swan sugarbush, is a flowering shrub of the genus Protea.

Taxonomy
Protea witzenbergiana was first described by Edwin Percy Phillips in 1910, from specimens found growing in the Witzenberg range by Karl Ludwig Philipp Zeyher and William John Burchell.

Description
The shrub spreads out and can become three metres in diameter and half a metre high. It blooms in Autumn to early Winter, from March to June with the peak in April to May.

Distribution
The plant is endemic to the Western Cape, South Africa, and occurs from the Cederberg, through the Koue Bokkeveld Mountains and the Witzenberg, to Hex River Mountains and the Bokkerivier Mountains. It is found near the towns of Tulbagh and Ceres.

It is somewhat similar to Protea pityphylla and P. pendula.

Ecology
Potential wildfires destroy the shrub, but the seeds can survive such an event. The plant is monoecious with both sexes in each flower. It is thought that rodents are probably responsible for pollination. The seeds are spread by the wind. The plant grows on mountainous slopes at altitudes of 750 to 1,800 metres.

Conservation
The population is considered stable.

References

witzenbergiana
Flora of South Africa